Defiant Order is the third studio album by French electronic turntable band Birdy Nam Nam. The album was released via Savoir Faire / SME France on 19 September 2011 and was re-released worldwide on 28 May 2013 through Owsla. A four-part series of remix EPs were released weekly starting on 7 June 2013, including tracks from their 2012 mixtape Geto Bird.

Singles
"Defiant Order" is the album's lead single. It was initially released on 15 June 2011, and was re-released on Owsla alongside four remixes on 22 January 2013. A remix by Phuture Doom was also released on Owsla, exclusively to their subscription service "Nest".
"Goin' In" is the second single from the album. It was released on 9 May 2011. The song, alongside remixes by Skrillex and French Fries, also features on the "Jaded Future" extended play. The track was remixed several times by Skrillex, who made a "Goin' Hard" mix, a "Goin' Down" mix, two unreleased remixes and a Dog Blood remix with Boys Noize. The A$AP Rocky song "Wild For the Night" on his album LONG.LIVE.A$AP samples Skrillex's "Goin' Down" remix, and both Skrillex and Birdy Nam Nam are credited as featured artists.
"Jaded Future" is the third single from the album. It was released on 16 July 2012 on Owsla, accompanied by "Goin' In", "Cadillac Dreams" and an assortment of remixes of the three tracks.

Track listing

Personnel
Birdy Nam Nam
Denis "DJ Need" Lebouvier – producer, mixing
Mickael "Lil Mike" Dalmoro – producer, mixing
Nicolas "Crazy B" Vadon – producer, mixing
Thomas "DJ Pone" Parent – producer, mixing

Additional musicians
Julien "Teki Latex" Pradeyrol – producer, mixing, vocals (5, 7, 9)

Release history

References

2011 albums
2013 albums
Owsla albums